Mitromorpha spreta is a species of sea snail, a marine gastropod mollusk in the family Mitromorphidae.

Description
A small pale-brown species with the seven whorls decussated by nine, fine longitudinal ribs and strong transverse lirae. The aperture is narrow. The outer lip shows two obsolete plicae.

Distribution
This marine species occurs off Japan.

References

  Adams A., On the Species of Mitrida found in the Sea of Japan; Journal of the Linnean Society of London vol. VII, 1864

Further reading
 

spreta
Gastropods described in 1864